Bandon Dunes Golf Resort is a complex of five links and a par-3 golf course on the West Coast of the United States, located alongside the Pacific Ocean in southwest Oregon, just north of the city of Bandon.

Courses
The first course at the resort, Bandon Dunes, opened on May 19, 1999. Bandon Dunes was designed by Scotsman David McLay Kidd, and it instantly garnered high praise.  The course was one of Kidd's early efforts in designing a golf course. Since opening, the original golf course on property has been adjusted.  Alterations include significant amounts of gorse removal and a rerouting of the par 3, second hole.  Bandon Dunes is traditionally home to resort guest's lowest scores, thanks to its forgiving landing areas off the tee and mildly to moderately undulated green complexes.

The resort's second course, Pacific Dunes, opened on July 1, 2001. Pacific Dunes was designed by Michigan architect Tom Doak, and sculpted by his design firm, Renaissance Design, Inc. Pacific Dunes also opened to glowing reviews and quickly surpassed Bandon Dunes as the highest-rated course on the property.  Pacific Dunes was rated the number one resort golf course in the country in 2005 by Golfweek magazine, placing just ahead of Pebble Beach. It is ranked 8th in the best links courses ranking by Golf Magazine in 2014.

The resort's third course, Bandon Trails, was designed by the team of Bill Coore and Ben Crenshaw. Bandon Trails opened on June 1, 2005. Bandon Trails departs from its siblings in that no holes are routed along the Pacific Ocean. The course meanders through dunes, meadows, and forest land.  Upon its opening, Golf Odyssey, the preeminent newsletter devoted to golf travel, named Bandon Dunes, The Best Place on the Planet for Golf.

The fourth course, Old Macdonald (in honor of Charles Blair Macdonald), was designed by a team led by Tom Doak and Jim Urbina. It opened in June 2010.

The fifth course, Bandon Preserve, is a Par-3 short course  There are 13 holes on the course.  It was also designed by Coore and Crenshaw, and the course opened on May 1, 2012.

A more recent addition to the Bandon Dunes family, The Punchbowl, is a  putting course designed by Doak and Urbina. It opened in 2014 and is adjacent to the first tee at Pacific Dunes. It has 18 holes and takes about an hour to play.  The area is a collection of natural hollows. Punchbowl is a longstanding design concept by golf architects. The 18th hole at Old Macdonald shares the same principles and is aptly named "Punchbowl."

The sixth and newest course, Sheep Ranch, opened on June 1, 2020. Located to the north of Old Macdonald, it has a mile of ocean frontage over a series of promontories, with several holes featuring shots over water and cliffs. The property had been a wind farm in the 1970s, but had been abandoned because the winds proved to be too intense for turbines of that era. Resort owner Mike Keiser bought the land in 2000 along with business partner Phil Friedmann, and originally intended for it to be a private course separate from the main resort. Doak and Urbina started work on the property after completing Pacific Dunes, and had completed 13 greens before Keiser and Friedmann stopped construction once locals heard about the project, fearing that the project would cause problems for the resort. For more than 15 years, the property sat largely vacant; the greens were not irrigated, and only a select number of resort guests who asked the right individuals were allowed on the incomplete course. Eventually, Keiser and Friedmann decided to incorporate this land into the resort, and enlisted Coore and Crenshaw to design a full course. Three pairs of holes that travel in different directions share teeing areas.

Use of golf carts is not permitted at the resort, unless required for medical reasons.

In 2009, Golf Magazine named the three courses existing at that time to its list of the 50 best courses built in the last 50 years. Pacific Dunes ranked second, Bandon Dunes twelfth, and Bandon Trails as thirty-third. In 2013 Golf Digest ranked Bandon Dunes (Old MacDonald) fifth in its list of the Top 50 Golf Courses for Women.

Tournaments held
The United States Golf Association has staged eight amateur championship tournaments at Bandon Dunes Golf Resort, the most recent being the 2022 U.S. Junior Amateur.

The USGA first came to Bandon Dunes in 2006, staging the Curtis Cup, a biennial women's amateur team competition between the United States and Great Britain/Ireland.  The matches took place on the Pacific Dunes course, and the U.S. won 11½ to 6½.

The next year, 2007, saw the resort host the U.S. Mid-Amateur Golf Championship.  Bandon Dunes was the primary course for the event, with Bandon Trails used as the second course for the stroke-play portion of the event.

Bandon Dunes hosted the 2011 U.S. Amateur Public Links and the U.S. Women's Amateur Public Links championship tournaments.  It was the first time the USGA held the men's and women's Public Links events jointly.  The tournaments were played on the Old Macdonald and Bandon Trails courses.

In 2015, the resort hosted the first-ever U.S. Women's Amateur Four-Ball, an event the USGA created to replace the Public Links, which was discontinued.  The event was held on the Pacific Dunes course.

Bandon Dunes was also the site of the 2019 U.S. Amateur Four-Ball. Old Macdonald was the primary course used for the event, with Pacific Dunes also used.

In 2020, the resort hosted the U.S. Amateur Championship for the first time. Bandon Dunes was the primary course, with Bandon Trails used as the second course for the stroke-play portion of the event. Tyler Strafaci won the tournament, defeating Ollie Osborne in the final match, during which the contestants played through thick fog during the final holes.

In 2021, the USGA announced that 12 additional championships would be held at the course through 2045 including the 2025 U.S. Women's Amateur, and 2029 Walker Cup.

In 2022, the resort hosted the U.S. Junior Amateur for the first time. Bandon Dunes was the primary course, with Bandon Trails used as the second course for the stroke-play portion of the event.

Scorecards

Gallery

References

External links
 
 Aerial view from Google Maps

1999 establishments in Oregon
Buildings and structures in Coos County, Oregon
Curtis Cup venues
Golf clubs and courses in Oregon
Oregon Coast
Tourist attractions in Coos County, Oregon